Lindsey Hunter (born March 30, 1984) is a retired American female volleyball player. She was part of the United States women's national volleyball team.

She participated at the 2007 Pan American Games, and at the 2007 FIVB Volleyball Women's World Cup.

References

External links
 

1984 births
Living people
American women's volleyball players
Volleyball players at the 2007 Pan American Games
Place of birth missing (living people)
Pan American Games medalists in volleyball
Pan American Games bronze medalists for the United States
Setters (volleyball)
Medalists at the 2007 Pan American Games
Missouri Tigers women's volleyball players